Pangayarselvi is a village in Tiruchirapalli district, Tamil Nadu.

The story begins with the name itself; Pangayarselvi is the name of goddess and also the wife of Lord Vishnu (Pundarikaksha Perumal). Goddess Pangayarselvi was born in the tiny village.  Because of her birth the village got its name as Pangayarselvi. It is come under Musiri constituency.  In the origin, people belonging the small village are all bhramins.

After the 15th century, people belonging the warrior community where lived in senakarai nearest to Vaathalai Dam migrated and eradicated the existing people.

Notes

Villages in Tiruchirappalli district